Terra nullius (plural terrae nullius) is a Latin expression meaning "nobody's land". It was a principle sometimes used in international law to justify claims that territory may be acquired by a state's occupation of it. There are currently three territories claimed to be terra nullius, two of which are caused by border disputes between sovereign states.

Doctrine 
In international law, terra nullius is territory which belongs to no state. Sovereignty over territory which is terra nullius can be acquired by any state by occupation. According to Oppenheim: "The only territory which can be the object of occupation is that which does not already belong to another state, whether it is uninhabited, or inhabited by persons whose community is not considered to be a state; for individuals may live on as territory without forming themselves into a state proper exercising sovereignty over such territory."

Occupation of terra nullius is one of several ways in which a state can acquire territory under international law. The other means of acquiring territory are conquest, cession by agreement, accretion through the operations of nature, and prescription through the continuous exercise of sovereignty.

History
Although the term terra nullius was not used in international law before the late nineteenth century, some writers have traced the concept to the Roman law term res nullius, meaning nobody's thing. In Roman law, things that were res nullius, such as wild animals (ferae bestiae), lost slaves and abandoned buildings could be taken as property by anyone by seizure. Benton and Strauman, however, state that the derivation of terra nullius from res nullius is "by analogy" only.

Sixteenth century writings on res nullius were in the context of European colonisation in the New World and the doctrine of discovery. In 1535, Domingo de Soto argued that Spain had no right to the Americas because the lands had not been res nullius at the time of discovery. Francisco di Vitoria, in 1539, also used the res nullius analogy to argue that the indigenous populations of the Americas, although “barbarians”, had both sovereignty and private ownership over their lands, and that the Spanish had gained no legal right to possession through mere discovery of these lands. Nevertheless, Vitoria stated that the Spanish possibly had a limited right to rule the indigenous Americans because the latter “are unsuited to setting up or administering a commonwealth both legitimate and ordered in human and civil terms.”

Alberico Gentili, in his De Jure Belli Libri Tres (1598), drew a distinction between the legitimate occupation of land that was res nullius and illegitimate claims of sovereignty through discovery and occupation of land that was not res nullius, as in the case of the Spanish claim to the Americas. Hugo Grotius, writing in 1625, also stated that discovery does not give a right to sovereignty over inhabited land, “For discovery applies to those things which belong to no one.”

By the eighteenth century, however, some writers argued that territorial rights over land could stem from the settlement and cultivation of that land. William Blackstone, in 1756, wrote, “Plantations or colonies, in distant countries, are either such where the lands are claimed by right of occupancy only, by finding them desert and uncultivated, and peopling them from the mother-country; or where, when already cultivated, they have been either gained by conquest, or ceded to us by treaties. And both these rights are founded upon the law of nature, or at least upon that of nations."

Borch states that many commentators erroneously interpreted this to mean that uncultivated lands, whether inhabited or not, could be claimed by a colonising state by right of occupancy. Two years after Blackstone, Emer de Vattel, in his Le droit des gents (1758), drew a distinction between land that was effectively occupied and cultivated, and the unsettled and uncultivated land of nomads which was open to colonisation.

The Berlin West Africa Conference of 1884-85 endorsed the principle that sovereignty over an unclaimed territory required effective occupation, and that where native populations had established effective occupation their sovereignty could not be unilaterally overturned by a colonising state.

The term terra nullius was used in 1885 in relation to the dispute between Spain and the United States over Contoy Island. Herman Eduard von Hoist, wrote, “Contoy was not, in an international sense, a desert, that is an abandoned island and hence terra nullius." In 1888, the Institut de Droit International introduced the concept of territorium nullius (nobody’s territory) as a public law equivalent to the private law concept of res nullius.

In 1909, the Italian international jurist Camille Piccioni described the island of Spitzbergen in the Arctic Circle as terra nullius. Even though the island was inhabited by the nationals of several European countries, the inhabitants did not live under any formal sovereignty.

In subsequent decades, the term terra nullius gradually replaced territorium nullius. Fitzmaurice argues that the two concepts were initially distinct, territorium nullius applying to territory in which the inhabitants might have property rights but had not developed political sovereignty whereas terra nullius referred to an absence of property. Nevertheless, terra nullius also implied an absence of sovereignty because sovereignty required property rights acquired through the exploitation of nature. Michael Connor, however, argues that territorium nullius and terra nullius were the same concept, meaning land without sovereignty, and that property rights and cultivation of land were not part of the concept.

The term terra nullius was adopted by the International Court of Justice in its 1975 Western Sahara advisory opinion. The majority wrote, "'Occupation' being legally an original means of peaceably acquiring sovereignty over territory otherwise than by cession or succession, it was a cardinal condition of a valid 'occupation' that the territory should be terra nullius – a territory belonging to no-one – at the time of the act alleged to constitute the 'occupation'.” The court found that at the time of Spanish colonisation in 1884, the inhabitants of Western Sahara were nomadic but socially and politically organised in tribes and under chiefs competent to represent them. According to State practice of the time the territory therefore was not terra nullius.

Current claims of terra nullius
Currently, there are three territories claimed to be terra nullius, Marie Byrd Land in Antarctica, Bir Tawil bordering Egypt and the Sudan, and several small areas along the Croatia–Serbia border.

Antarctica

While several countries have made claims to parts of Antarctica in the first half of the 20th century, the remainder, including most of Marie Byrd Land (the portion east from 150°W to 90°W), has not been claimed by any sovereign state. Signatories to the Antarctic Treaty of 1959 agreed not to make such claims, except the Soviet Union and the United States, who reserved the right to make a claim.

Bir Tawil

Bir Tawil is an example of a territory often claimed to be terra nullius. Between Egypt and the Sudan is the  landlocked territory of Bir Tawil, which was created by a discrepancy between borders drawn in 1899 and 1902. One border placed Bir Tawil under the Sudan's control and the Halaib Triangle under Egypt's; the other border did the reverse. Each country asserts the border that would give it the much larger Halaib Triangle, to the east, which is adjacent to the Red Sea, with the side effect that Bir Tawil is unclaimed by either country (each claims the other owns it). Bir Tawil has no settled population, but the land is used by Bedouins who roam the area.

Gornja Siga and other pockets

Croatia and Serbia dispute several small areas on the east bank of the Danube. However, some pockets on the west bank, of which Gornja Siga is the largest, are not claimed by either country. Croatia states the pockets are Serbian, while Serbia makes no claims on the land.

On 13 April 2015, Vít Jedlička from the Czech Party of Free Citizens proclaimed the right-libertarian micronation of Liberland on Gornja Siga.
The Croatian Ministry of Foreign and European Affairs has rejected these claims, stating that the differing border claims between Serbia and Croatia do not involve terra nullius, and are not subject to occupation by a third party. The Serbian Ministry of Foreign Affairs stated on 24 April 2015 that while Serbia considers "Liberland" to be a frivolous matter, it does not impinge upon the Serbian border, which is delineated by the Danube.

Historical claims of terra nullius
Several territories have been claimed to be terra nullius. In a minority of those claims, international and domestic courts have ruled on whether the territory is or was terra nullius or not.

Africa

Burkina Faso and Niger
A narrow strip of land adjacent to two territorial markers along the Burkina Faso–Niger border was claimed by neither country until the International Court of Justice settled a more extensive territorial dispute in 2013. The former unclaimed territory was awarded to Niger.

Western Sahara

At the request of Morocco, the International Court of Justice in 1975 addressed whether Western Sahara was terra nullius at the time of Spanish colonization in 1885. The court found in its advisory opinion that Western Sahara was not terra nullius at that time.

Asia

Pinnacle Islands (Diaoyu Islands/Senkaku Islands)
A disputed archipelago in the East China Sea, the uninhabited Pinnacle Islands, were claimed by Japan to have become part of its territory as terra nullius in January 1895, following the Japanese victory in the First Sino-Japanese War. However, this interpretation is not accepted by the People's Republic of China (PRC) and the Republic of China (Taiwan), both of whom claim sovereignty over the islands.

Scarborough Shoal (South China Sea)
The People's Republic of China and the Philippines both claim the Scarborough Shoal or Panatag Shoal or Huangyan Island, nearest to the island of Luzon, located in the South China Sea. The Philippines claims it under the principles of terra nullius and EEZ (exclusive economic zone). China's claim refers to its discovery in the 13th century by Chinese fishermen (the former Nationalist government on the Chinese mainland had also claimed this territory after the founding of the Republic of China in 1911). However, despite China's position of non-participation in a United Nations Convention on the Law of the Sea case, in 2016, the Permanent Court of Arbitration (PCA) denied the lawfulness of China's "nine-dash line" claim.

Despite this, China continues to build artificial islands in the South China Sea, and Scarborough Shoal is a prime location for another one. Chinese ships have been seen in the vicinity of the shoal. Analysis of photos has concluded that the ships lack dredging equipment and therefore represent no imminent threat of reclamation work.

Europe

Ireland
The term terra nullius has been applied by some modern academics in discussing the English colonisation of Ireland, although the term is not used in the international law sense and is often used as an analogy. Griffen and Cogliano state that the English viewed Ireland as a terra nullius. In The Irish Difference: A Tumultuous History of Ireland’s Breakup With Britain, Fergal Tobin writes that "Ireland had no tradition of unified statehood and no culturally unified establishment. Indeed, it had never known any kind of political unity until a version of it was imposed by Cromwell's sword […] So the English Protestant interest […] came to regard Ireland as a kind of terra nullius." Similarly, Bruce McLeod writes in The Geography of Empire in English Literature, 1580-1745 that "although the English were familiar with Ireland and its geography in comparison to North America, they treated Ireland as though it were terra nullius and thus easily and geometrically subdivided into territorial units." Rolston and McVeigh trace this attitude back to Gerald of Wales (13th century), who wrote "This people despises work on the land, has little use for the money-making of towns, contemns the rights and privileges of citizenship, and desires neither to abandon, nor lose respect for, the life which it has been accustomed to lead in the woods and countryside." The semi-nomadism of the native Irish meant that some English judged them not to be productive users of land. However, Rolston and McVeigh state that Gerald made it clear that Ireland was acquired by conquest and not through the occupation of terra nullius.

Rockall
According to Ian Mitchell, Rockall was terra nullius until it was claimed by the United Kingdom in 1955.
It was formally annexed in 1972.

Sealand
In 1967, Paddy Roy Bates claimed an abandoned British anti-aircraft gun tower in the North Sea  as the "Principality of Sealand". The structure is now within British territorial waters and no country recognises Sealand.

Svalbard
Denmark–Norway, the Dutch Republic, the Kingdom of Great Britain, and the Kingdom of Scotland all claimed sovereignty over the archipelago of Svalbard in the seventeenth century, but none permanently occupied it. Expeditions from each of these polities visited Svalbard principally during the summer for whaling, with the first two sending a few wintering parties in the 1620s and 1630s.

During the 19th century, both Norway and Russia made strong claims to the archipelago. In 1909, Italian jurist Camille Piccioni described Spitzbergen, as it was then known, as terra nullius:

The territorial dispute was eventually resolved by the Svalbard Treaty of 9 February 1920 which recognized Norwegian sovereignty over the islands.

North America

Canada
Joseph Trutch, the first Lieutenant Governor of British Columbia, insisted that First Nations had never owned land, and thus their land claims could safely be ignored. It is for this reason that most of British Columbia remains unceded land.

In Guerin v. The Queen, a Canadian Supreme Court decision of 1984 on aboriginal rights, the Court stated that the government has a fiduciary duty toward the First Nations of Canada and established aboriginal title to be a sui generis right. Since then there has been a more complicated debate and a general narrowing of the definition of "fiduciary duty".

Eastern Greenland
Norway occupied and claimed parts of (then uninhabited) eastern Greenland in 1931, claiming that it constituted terra nullius and calling the territory Erik the Red's Land.
The Permanent Court of International Justice ruled against the Norwegian claim. The Norwegians accepted the ruling and withdrew their claim.

United States
A similar concept of "uncultivated land" was employed by John Quincy Adams to identify supposedly unclaimed wilderness.

Guano Islands
The Guano Islands Act of 18 August 1856 enabled citizens of the U.S. to take possession of islands containing guano deposits. The islands can be located anywhere, so long as they are not occupied and not within the jurisdiction of other governments. It also empowers the President of the United States to use the military to protect such interests, and establishes the criminal jurisdiction of the United States.

Oceania

Australia
The British penal colony of New South Wales, which included more than half of mainland Australia, was proclaimed by Governor Captain Arthur Phillip at Sydney in February 1788. At the time of British colonisation, Aboriginal Australians had occupied Australia for at least 50,000 years. They were complex hunter-gatherers with diverse economies and societies and about 250 different language groups. The Aboriginal population of the Sydney area was an estimated 4,000 to 8,000 people who were organised in clans which occupied land with traditional boundaries.

There is debate over whether Australia was colonised by the British from 1788 on the basis that the land was terra nullius. Frost, Attwood and others argue that even though the term terra nullius was not used in the eighteenth century, there was widespread acceptance of the concept that a state could acquire territory through occupation of land that was not already under sovereignty and was uninhabited or inhabited by peoples who had not developed permanent settlements, agriculture, property rights or political organisation recognised by European states. Borch, however, states that, "it seems much more likely that there was no legal doctrine maintaining that inhabited land could be regarded as ownerless, nor was this the basis of official policy, in the eighteenth century or before. Rather it seems to have developed as a legal theory in the nineteenth century.”

In Mabo v Queensland (No 2) (1992), Justice Dawson stated, "Upon any account, the policy which was implemented and the laws which were passed in New South Wales make it plain that, from the inception of the colony, the Crown treated all land in the colony as unoccupied and afforded no recognition to any form of native interest in the land."

Stuart Banner states that the first known Australian legal use of the concept (although not the term) terra nullius was in 1819 in a tax dispute between Barron Field and the Governor of New South Wales Lachlan Macquarie. The matter was referred to British Attorney General Samuel Shepherd and Solicitor General Robert Gifford who advised that New South Wales had not been acquired by conquest or cession, but by possession as "desert and uninhabited". 

In 1835, a Proclamation by Governor Bourke stated that British subjects could not obtain title over vacant Crown land directly from Aboriginal Australians.

In R v Murrel (1836) Justice Burton of the Supreme Court of New South Wales stated, “although it might be granted that on the first taking possession of the Colony, the aborigines were entitled to be recognised as free and independent, yet they were not in such a position with regard to strength as to be considered free and independent tribes. They had no sovereignty.” 

In the Privy Council case Cooper v Stuart (1889), Lord Watson stated that New South Wales was, "a tract of territory practically unoccupied, without settled inhabitants or settled law, at the time when it was peacefully annexed to the British dominions."

In the Mabo Case (1992), the High Court of Australia considered the question of whether Australia had been colonised by Britain on the basis that it was terra nullius. The court did not consider the legality of the initial colonisation as this was a matter of international law and, "The acquisition of territory by a sovereign state for the first time is an act of state which cannot be challenged, controlled or interfered with by the courts of that state." The questions for decision included the implications of the initial colonisation for the transmission of the common law to New South Wales and whether the common law recognised that the Indigenous inhabitants had any form of native title to land. Dismissing a number of previous authorities, the court rejected the "enlarged notion of terra nullius", by which lands inhabited by Indigenous peoples could be considered desert and uninhabited for the purposes of Australian municipal law. The court found that the common law of Australia recognised a form of native title held by the Indigenous peoples of Australia and that this title persisted unless extinguished by a valid exercise of sovereign power inconsistent with the continued right to enjoy native title.

Clipperton Island
The sovereignty of Clipperton Island was settled by arbitration between France and Mexico. King Victor Emmanuel III of Italy rendered a decision in 1931 that the sovereignty of Clipperton Island belongs to France from the date of November 17, 1858. The Mexican claim was rejected for lack of proof of prior Spanish discovery and, in any event, no effective occupation by Mexico before 1858, when the island was therefore territorium nullius, and the French occupation then was sufficient and legally continuing.

South Island of New Zealand
In 1840, the newly appointed Lieutenant-Governor of New Zealand, Captain William Hobson of the Royal Navy, following instructions from the British government, declared the Middle Island of New Zealand (later known as the "South Island") as terra nullius, and therefore fit for occupation by European settlers. Hobson's decision was also influenced by a  small party of French settlers heading towards Akaroa on the Banks Peninsula to settle in 1840.

South America

Patagonia
Patagonia was according to some considerations regarded a terra nullius in the 19th century. This notion ignored the Spanish Crown's recognition of indigenous Mapuche sovereignty and is considered by scholars Nahuelpán and Antimil to have set the stage for an era of Chilean "republican colonialism".

Limits of national jurisdiction and sovereignty
View the following chart as if it was a "cross-section" of Earth, stretching from underground to outer space.

{| class="wikitable" style="text-align:center;" cellpadding="5"
|+Limits of national jurisdiction and sovereignty
|-
|style="background:#ff9090;color:black;border:3px dashed red;"colspan="8"| Outer space (including Earth's orbits; the Moon and other celestial bodies, and their orbits)
|-
|style="background:#90ff90;color:black;border:2px solid black;"colspan="2"| national airspace
|style="background:yellow;color:black;border:2px solid black;"| territorial waters airspace
|style="background:yellow;color:black;border:2px solid black;"| contiguous zone airspace   
|style="background:#ff9090;color:black;border:2px solid black;"colspan="4"| international airspace
|-
|style="background:#90ff90;color:black;border:2px solid black;"| territorial land surface
|style="background:#90ff90;color:black;border:2px solid black;"| internal waters' surface
|style="background:#90ff90;color:black;border:2px solid black;"| territorial waters' surface
|style="background:yellow;color:black;border:2px solid black;"| contiguous zone surface waters
|style="background:yellow;color:black;border:2px solid black;"| exclusive economic zone waters' surface
|style="background:#ff9090;color:black;border:2px solid black;"colspan="3"| international waters' surface
|- style="color:black;"
|style="background:#90ff90;border:2px solid black;"colspan="2"| internal waters
|style="background:#90ff90;color:black;border:2px solid black;"| territorial waters
|style="background:yellow;color:black;border:2px solid black;"colspan="2"| exclusive economic zone
|style="background:#ff9090;color:black;border:2px solid black;"colspan="3"| international waters
|-
|style="background:#90ff90;color:black; border:2px solid black;"colspan="2" rowspan="2"| under ground surface in land territory
|style="background:#90ff90;color:black; border:2px solid black;"| surface waters overlying continental shelf
|style="background:yellow;color:black;border:2px solid black;"colspan="2"| surface waters overlying continental shelf
|style="background:yellow;color:black;border:2px solid black;"| surface waters overlying extended continental shelf
|style="background:#ff9090;color:black;border:2px solid black;"| international waters' seabed surface
|-
|style="background:#90ff90;color:black;border:2px solid black;"colspan="3"| beneath continental shelf seabed
|style="background:yellow;color:black;border:2px solid black;"| beneath extended continental shelf seabed
|style="background:#ff9090;color:black;border:2px solid black;"| international waters beneath seabed
|}

See also

Appropriation concepts

Footnotes

References

Sources

 
 
 
 
  book info here. svenlindqvist.net (author's website).

Further reading

External links
 

 

 

  – Governor Burke's 1835 proclamation of terra nullius.

  – analysis of Michael Conner's denial of terra nullius (The Invention of Terra Nullius).

 

 .

 .

 

 

 

 .

Common law
Constitutional state types
International law
Legal fictions
Latin legal terminology
Aboriginal title
Legal doctrines and principles
Colonialism
Space law